President-elect of Brazil is the title used to refer to the winning candidate of the presidential elections of Brazil, in the period between the announcement of the election results and his taking office, from which he becomes constitutionally President of Brazil and has beginning of his term. The first directly elected president in Brazil was Prudente de Morais after winning the presidential election in Brazil in 1894, defeating Afonso Pena.

Currently, when a president is elected in Brazil, during confirmation at the polls and until their inauguration, all television newspapers and news papers refer to them as the "elected president." This title cannot be attained by incumbent presidents. During the period he holds that title, they are certified by the TSE (Superior Electoral Court), which makes official the results of the polls and is a formal condition for the president-elect to take office on January 1, days after winning at the polls.

According to article 77 of the Federal Constitution of Brazil, the candidate who obtains half of the valid votes plus one in an election held on the first Sunday of October is considered elected. If no candidate reaches this mark, a second round is called between the two candidates with the highest number of votes in the first round, to be held on the last Sunday of October. The Constitution further determines that the president be elected for a four-year term, with the right to reelection, starting on January 1 of the following year.

The outgoing president should assemble a team that will work with the president-elect's team. Between the election and the inauguration, both teams, as well as the occupying president and the elected one, meet several times so that the new ruler and his team can adapt to all their future obligations. The transition process begins on the second business day after the announcement of the election result, and ends up to ten days after the president-elect takes office.

List

References